Ascalenia is a genus of moths in the family Cosmopterigidae.

Species
Ascalenia acaciella Chretien, 1915
Ascalenia albitergis Meyrick, 1926
Ascalenia antiqua Meyrick, 1925
Ascalenia archaica Meyrick, 1917
Ascalenia beieri Kasy, 1968
Ascalenia bialbipunctella Legrand, 1965
Ascalenia bifasciella Chrétien, 1915
Ascalenia callynella Kasy, 1968
Ascalenia centropselia Meyrick, 1931
Ascalenia crypsiloga Meyrick, 1915
Ascalenia decolorella Sinev, 1984
Ascalenia echidnias (Meyrick, 1891)
Ascalenia epicrypta Meyrick, 1915
Ascalenia exodroma (Meyrick, 1897)
Ascalenia gastrocosma Meyrick, 1931
Ascalenia grisella Kusnetzov, 1957
Ascalenia icriota Meyrick, 1915
Ascalenia imbella Kasy, 1975
Ascalenia isotacta Meyrick, 1911
Ascalenia jerichoella Amsel, 1935
Ascalenia kabulella Kasy, 1969
Ascalenia kairaella Kasy, 1969
Ascalenia liparophanes Meyrick, 1932
Ascalenia melanogastra (Meyrick, 1918)
Ascalenia molifera Meyrick, 1915
Ascalenia nudicornis (Meyrick, 1913)
Ascalenia pachnodes Meyrick, 1917
Ascalenia pancrypta (Meyrick, 1915)
Ascalenia phaneracma Meyrick, 1921
Ascalenia plumbata (Meyrick, 1915)
Ascalenia praediata Meyrick, 1922
Ascalenia pseudofusella Legrand, 1965
Ascalenia pulverata (Meyrick, 1913)
Ascalenia revelata Meyrick, 1922
Ascalenia scotochalca Meyrick, 1934
Ascalenia secretifera Meyrick, 1932
Ascalenia semnostola (Meyrick, 1897)
Ascalenia sirjanella Kasy, 1975
Ascalenia spermatica Meyrick, 1915
Ascalenia staurocentra (Meyrick, 1915)
Ascalenia subusta Meyrick, 1921
Ascalenia synclina Meyrick, 1908
Ascalenia thoracista Meyrick, 1915
Ascalenia unifasciella Kasy, 1969
Ascalenia vadata Meyrick, 1922
Ascalenia vanella (Frey, 1860)
Ascalenia vanelloides Gerasimov, 1930
Ascalenia viviparella Kasy, 1969

Former species
Ascalenia antidesma 
Ascalenia ceanothiella Meyrick, 1915
Ascalenia cardinata 
Ascalenia conformata 
Ascalenia eremella 
Ascalenia heterosticta Meyrick, 1917
Ascalenia leucomelanella 
Ascalenia maculatella 
Ascalenia noviciata 
Ascalenia oranella 
Ascalenia phalacra Meyrick, 1909
Ascalenia satellita 
Ascalenia seeboldiella 
Ascalenia signatella 
Ascalenia stagnans 
Ascalenia tergipunctella

References
Natural History Museum Lepidoptera genus database
Ascalenia at Fauna Europaea
Ascalenia at Afro Moths
Revised Checklist of Cosmopterigidae in Neotropical Region
 (in German) Kasy; 1969/ Vorläufige Revision der Gattung Ascalenia Wocke (Lepidoptera, Walshiidae)

 
Chrysopeleiinae
Moth genera